John Evans (born John Bryan Casey on 5 May 1980) is a Welsh film and television director, writer, and producer. He also works as an artist working under the name JB Evans. He is a former soldier. He works in the medium of both English and Welsh and produces both factual and fiction productions.

Early and Pre-career Life 

Born in Wrexham, North Wales on 5 May 1980, Evans grew up in Bangor, Gwynedd. He went to local schools Ysgol Cae Top and Ysgol Friars. His headmaster at Ysgol Cae Top was John McBryde, father of former Wales international rugby union player Robin McBryde.
In 1996 Evans joined the British Army, serving as a Royal Engineer and saw service in Northern Ireland, Bosnia, Kosovo, Afghanistan and Iraq
After leaving the armed forces Evans attended Bangor University and studied Film. He was awarded a First Class BA(Hons) and later received a Distinction in a Film making MA.

Career 

Although his undergraduate degree was predominately academic Evans began making short films while studying at University. He won the 2012 Welsh Royal Television Society Best Fiction award for his graduation film Long I Stood There. His short Welsh Language film NOT was also recognised by the RTS. His step-daughter Ceri and daughter Annabel played the two young children in the film about domestic abuse which made an allegorical reference to the Welsh Not, with the former winning a number of Best Actress awards.
In 2013 he made the documentary Curtains which featured on BBC Three Fresh. It focused on a Women's Aid refuge, the staff and women that had escaped domestic abuse. Evans grew up watching his mother abused by his father. After the break-up of his parents he and his siblings took their mother's surname.

For a BBC interview about the film he stated "I grew up having to watch my mum beaten and bullied by my abusive father. The film as a result became a very personal journey. With Curtains, I think I became as much as a participant as the women and support workers. With some reflexive reverting, perhaps I provided the child's point of view, the only view I have."
Evans placed the dedication "For my mum" at the end of the film.
In 2014 his short drama Jam Man was nominated at the Celtic Media Festival for Best Short Drama. Evans and the film where then nominated by the Royal Television Society for Best Drama. The Welsh language drama was first broadcast on Sky Arts. He then went on to produce and direct Cysgod Rhyfel (The Shadow of War) which was broadcast on S4C. The film focused on soldiers with Posttraumatic stress disorder and used the talking head accounts of war veterans who had served in Northern Ireland, the Falklands War, Bosnia, Kosovo, Afghanistan and Iraq, along with highly stylised dramatic sequences written by Evans . During the film Maldwyn Jones, a Falklands veteran contributing to the film discussed the suicide of L/Sgt Dan Collins, who had struggled with PTSD after serving in Afghanistan. The film showed the video message Dan left his mother Deana who had contributed to the film.
During an interview with Jason Mohammad about the film Evans stated 'The sad thing is, all too often something happens and it goes too far. Dan couldn't cope any more and felt he needed to take his own life. These almost cataclysmic events will raise the subject, but it's just really sad that something like that had to happen first'.
Evans went on to make a documentary film for S4C in Afghanistan with former Royal Marine officer and Conspicuous Gallantry Cross recipient Owen Davis.

After this Evans went on to direct on the S4C series Ward Plant and the BBC One series Flint Des Res. His diverse range continued when Evans began directing episodes of the CBS crime drama Elementary, while going on to create the children S4C series Antur Natur Cyw.

Personal life 

Evans lives on Anglesey with his family. He has three children Annabel, Jack and Scarlet. He also has a step-daughter, Ceri. Despite working and having written in the Welsh language he does not consider himself a fluent Welsh speaker.

His former brother-in-law is Sion Edwards who plays football for Bangor City.

Filmography

References

External links 

John Evans BBC Three Profile BBC Three Fresh
Welsh Filmmaker's artwork JB Evans Art JB Evans Art

1980 births
Living people
People from Bangor, Gwynedd
Alumni of Bangor University
Welsh film directors
Welsh television directors
Welsh screenwriters
Royal Engineers soldiers
People from Wrexham
 Welsh
Welsh military personnel
20th-century British Army personnel
21st-century British Army personnel